Crutchfield Branch is a  long 4th order tributary to Mayo Creek in Halifax County, Virginia.

Course
Crutchfield Branch rises about 2 miles northeast of Bethel Hill, North Carolina, and then flows northeast into Halifax County, Virginia to join Mayo Creek about 1.5 miles south of Mayo.

Watershed
Crutchfield Branch drains  of area, receives about 45.9 in/year of precipitation, has a wetness index of 485.76, and is about 45% forested.

References

Rivers of North Carolina
Rivers of Virginia
Rivers of Halifax County, Virginia
Rivers of Person County, North Carolina
Tributaries of the Roanoke River